Alvaro López (born 27 March 1954) is a retired Swiss football midfielder.

References

1954 births
Living people
Swiss people of Spanish descent
Swiss men's footballers
FC Sion players
CS Chênois players
Swiss Super League players
Association football midfielders